IF Sundsvall Hockey is a Swedish ice hockey club based in Sundsvall.  The club currently competes in Hockeyettan, the third tier of ice hockey in Sweden.  Sundsvall plays their home matches at Gärdehov, with a capacity of 2,500.

History
The club was founded in 1896 as Tunadals Skid och Skridskoförening (Tundal Ski and Skate Club), which was active mainly in ice skating, but also participated in athletics, association football, and orienteering.  Participation in ice hockey wouldn't begin until 1952.  In 1976, the club was reorganized as Sundsvall/Tunadals IF, which was later given its current name of IF Sundsvall Hockey in 1985.

Sundsvall has previously spent many years playing in the second-tier of Swedish hockey, but was relegated to the third tier following the 2011–12 HockeyAllsvenskan season.

Season-by-season

Women's side    
In May 2017, the club eliminated its women's side, despite them having just managed to save their place in the top-flight Swedish Women's Hockey League (SDHL) during the qualification playoffs. The organisation cited a need to save money for its third-tier men's side. The club was criticised for the decision, with forward Mathilda Gustafsson stating that "If we were a company instead of an association, you would never shut down a department which only employed women because the cost inhibits the male employees."

External links
Official homepage

References

Sundsvall Hockey IF
Sundsvall Hockey IF
Ice hockey teams in Västernorrland County